Pyronia is a genus of butterflies from the subfamily Satyrinae in the family Nymphalidae.

Description 
These butterflies have vestigial forelegs that cannot be used for walking. Male forelegs exhibit 2 tarsal joints, while female forelegs have 4.

Species
Listed alphabetically:
Pyronia bathseba (Fabricius, 1793) – Spanish gatekeeper (Morocco, Algeria, southwest Europe) 
Pyronia cecilia (Vallantin, 1894) – southern gatekeeper (Morocco, southern Europe, Asia Minor)
Pyronia coenonympha Felder, 1865 – (Himalayas)
Pyronia janiroides (Herrich-Schäffer, [1851]) – false meadow brown (Algeria, Tunisia) 
Pyronia tithonus (Linnaeus, 1771) – gatekeeper or hedge brown (Europe, Asia Minor, Caucasus, Morocco)

References 

 
Satyrini
Butterfly genera
Taxa named by Jacob Hübner